St. Joseph's Matriculation Higher Secondary School is an all-girls Catholic school for grades 1st through 12th standard in Coimbatore, Tamil Nadu, India. It is located on Trichy road in a three-school complex with its sister schools St. Francis and St. Marys.

Governing body
The school is run by FMM sisters.

History
The school was founded in 1960 by Mother Mary of the passion. It attained its golden jubilee in 2010.

Uniform
The school's colors are maroon and white.

School uniforms for regular days are made up of a maroon dress,  black shoes, white socks and white collared shirt. 
For P.T. (play time) days, the green, maroon, purple, or blue (depends on the house- Loyalty, Charity, Truth, Honor respectively) collared shirt and white socks along with a white pleated skirt and white sneakers constitute the uniform.

Houses
There are four houses, named after the qualities valued most by the school :
 Charity
 Loyalty
 Truth
 Honor

Competitions
The school conducts inter-house competitions like mass drills, salad making, mehendi drawing, poetry and writing, etc. The House Cup was introduced in 2009.

School hours
The school functions on Mondays, Wednesdays and Fridays from 8.30 am to 3.20 pm, with eight 40-minute periods.

On Tuesdays and Thursdays, the school functions from 8.30 am to 4.00 pm, with theeight 40-minute periods, with an additional period for games and club activities.

School clubs
A few prominent ones are:
 Social-Service Club
 Eco and Pulse club
 English Literary Club
 Hindi Literary Club
 Art and Craft Club
Tamil Literature Club
Maths Club
 Guides
 Bulbuls
 Computer Club.                                                                                                 
Karate.   
Band    
Every year, each club has an open exhibit, where the members showcase their talents, in the presence of an honored chief guest, connected to their club theme.

Sports
The school sports teams include basketball, volleyball and athletics. It co-hosted the District-Level zonals in 2012.

Franciscan high schools
Catholic secondary schools in India
Christian schools in Tamil Nadu
Girls' schools in Tamil Nadu
Primary schools in Tamil Nadu
High schools and secondary schools in Tamil Nadu
Schools in Coimbatore
Educational institutions established in 1960
1960 establishments in Madras State